Kaklık Cave is a touristic cave in Turkey.

Location
Visitors to the cave  follow the highway to east and in Kaklık town  they turn to north. The cave was opened to visits in 2002. There are a small amphitheatre, a swimming pool and a cafeteria in and around the cave.

The cave 

The cave is full of dripstones, stalactites and stalagmites. There are also travertine formations  and a small thermal lake at he bottom of the cave. The cave was formed by rift ponor. It is popularly called small Pamukkale referring to Pamukkale, a well known touristic place to the west of the cave.

Hyrochemical characteristics of the lake
According to the governor of Denizli Province the Hyrochemical characterisrtics of the lake water is as follows
Acidity (Ph):6.85
Water hardness:116.9
Amonium:None
Chlorine (active): None
Calcium: 286.17 mgr/lt
Magnesium:110.62 mgr/lt

References

Caves of Turkey
Denizli Province
Honaz District